Nicholas Caldecote (died 1443), of Meldreth, Cambridgeshire, was an English politician.

Family
Caldecote had three sons by his wife, Joan.

Career
He was a Member (MP) of the Parliament of England for Cambridgeshire in 1420, 1426, and 1431.

References

Year of birth missing
1443 deaths
People from South Cambridgeshire District
English MPs 1420
English MPs 1426
English MPs 1431